The Taphrinomycetes are a class of ascomycete fungi belonging to the subdivision Taphrinomycotina. It includes the single order Taphrinales, which includes 2 families, 8 genera and 140 species.

References

 
Fungus classes
Taxa described in 1997